Bauhinia tomentosa, also known as yellow bauhinia or yellow bell orchid tree, is a species of plant in the family Fabaceae. It is found in South Africa, Mozambique, Zimbabwe, Tropical Africa, India, and Sri Lanka.

Description
It has drooping slender branches with multiple scrambling stems. The bark is greyish, smooth, and sometimes hairy, which gives its specific name tomentosa. Greenish leaves are deeply divided and elliptic in nature; margin entire. Flowers  are bell-shaped with large, yellow petals with a dark maroon patch at the base. The fruit is a pale-brown pod. Extracts of the plant's roots have in vitro antimicrobial activity against Gram-positive bacteria.

References

tomentosa
Flora of Mozambique
Flora of Zimbabwe
Flora of India (region)
Flora of Sri Lanka